France was represented by Annick Thoumazeau, with the song "Autant d'amoureux que d'étoiles", at the 1984 Eurovision Song Contest, which took place on 5 May in Luxembourg City. The song was chosen through a national final organised by broadcaster Antenne 2.

Before Eurovision

National final 
The national final was held on 25 March, hosted by Jean-Pierre Foucault and Catherine Ceylac. Fourteen songs took part with the winner chosen by a panel of TV viewers who were telephoned and asked to vote on the songs.

At Eurovision 
On the night of the final Thoumazeau performed third in the running order, following Luxembourg and preceding Spain. At the close of voting "Autant d'amoureux que d'étoiles" had received 61 points, placing France 8th of the 19 entries. The French jury awarded its 12 points to Belgium.

Voting

References 

1984
Countries in the Eurovision Song Contest 1984
Eurovision
Eurovision